This article lists the winners and nominees for the NAACP Image Award for Outstanding Actress in a Drama Series. Not to be confused with the Award for Outstanding Actress in a Television Movie, Mini-Series or Dramatic Special. Currently, Della Reese holds the record for most wins in the category with seven.

Winners and nominees
Winners are listed first and highlighted in bold.

1970s

1980s

1990s

2000s

2010s

2020s

Multiple wins and nominations

Wins

 7 wins
 Della Reese

 4 wins
 Taraji P. Henson

 3 wins
 Angela Bassett
 Alfre Woodard

 2 wins
 Viola Davis
 Regina King
 Nia Long
 Regina Taylor
 Cicely Tyson
 Kerry Washington
 Lynn Whitfield

Nominations

 7 nominations
 Viola Davis
 Della Reese

 6 nominations
 Regina King
 C. C. H. Pounder
 Chandra Wilson
 Kerry Washington

 5 nominations
 Taraji P. Henson
 Nicole Ari Parker
 Lorraine Toussaint
 Vanessa A. Williams
 Rutina Wesley

 4 nominations
 Khandi Alexander
 S. Epatha Merkerson

 3 nominations
 Nicole Beharie
 Wendy Davis
 Sandra Oh

 Victoria Rowell
 Jurnee Smollett
 Regina Taylor
 Malinda Williams
 Cicely Tyson
 Alfre Woodard
 Angela Bassett

 2 nominations
 Jennifer Beals
 Vanessa Bell Calloway
 Loretta Devine
 Kimberly Elise
 Vivica A. Fox
 Nia Long
 Simone Missick
 Nicki Micheaux
 Rita Moreno
 Jada Pinkett Smith
 Gabrielle Union
 Lynn Whitfield
 Lauren Velez
 Octavia Spencer

References

NAACP Image Awards
Television awards for Best Actress